The State Register of Heritage Places is maintained by the Heritage Council of Western Australia. , 271 places are heritage-listed in the Shire of Manjimup, of which 16 are on the State Register of Heritage Places.

List
The Western Australian State Register of Heritage Places, lists the following 16 state registered places within the Shire of Manjimup:

References

Manjimup
Manjimup